Cessnock City Hornets FC is a semi-professional soccer club based in Cessnock in the Hunter Region, New South Wales. The Hornets currently compete in the NewFM Division with teams in First Grade, Reserve Grade, Under 18, Under 16, Under 15, Under 14 and Under 13 divisions. The NewFM Division is the 2nd tier of Football in Northern New South Wales Football below the NBN State Football League.

History
Over the years, doubt has been expressed about the birth of soccer in Cessnock.

To get down to the basic truths, Sid Grant, a well known historian, undertook a detailed research including personal interviews with old Bob Harden (ex-West Wallsend skipper), Tom Rennex, ‘G ‘Tup’’ Rennex, Alf Brunskill, Alec Renfrew and others.
But the truth of this problem came out when a former Secretary of the NDBFA, Mr George Reay of Dudley, presented Sid with both the official minute book and registrar of players book for the period 1902–1911.

This indicated clearly that soccer started in Cessnock in April, 1907. A group of 15 sportsmen met on a vacant allotment just south of the Cessnock railway station. Many of these enthusiasts were recent arrivals from Minmi, West Wallsend, Greta and Stockton.
The first ground was a large vacant area near where the Aberdare Park was established 15 years later.
2007 saw Cessnock celebrate 100 years of football.

Home ground
Cessnock play their home games at the Hornets Ground, Turner Park Complex, Aberdare Road, Aberdare.

Rivalries
Cessnock City Hornets' biggest rival is Weston Workers Bears FC. The Hornets also have a big local rivalry with Singleton Strikers.

Notable former players
Cessnock has had many players go on to represent Australia at a junior and senior level, including:

 Cliff Almond
 John Barr
 Les Brown
 Jack Drinkwater
 Jack Evans
 Jim Harden
 Lo Hearne
 Eddie Hodge
 Jack Lennard
 Perce Lennard
 William Lonergan
 Roy McNaughton
 Amber Neilson
 Kevin O'Neill
 Jim Orr
 Greg Owens
 Phil Peters
 John Pettigrew
 Alec Purdon
 John Roberts
 George Rowe
 George Russell
 Lorisssa Stevens
 Jack Taylor
 Cec Williams
 Ern Williams
 Clayton Zane

References

1907 establishments in Australia
Association football clubs established in 1907
Soccer clubs in New South Wales